Durdent may refer to:
 Durdent (river), a small coastal river that flows from the Pays de Caux in Normandy, France into the English Channel
 Le Mesnil-Durdent, a commune in the Seine-Maritime département, France
 Walter Durdent, a medieval Bishop of Coventry